The International Convention to Facilitate the Importation of Commercial Samples and Advertising Material is a 1952 United Nations multilateral treaty. States that ratify the treaty agree to allow product samples and advertising material into the county duty-free.

The Convention allows the duty-free importation of commercial samples that are determined to be of "negligible value". It also allows the duty-free importation of advertising material such as catalogues, price lists, and trade notices.

The convention was concluded in Geneva on 7 November 1952. It was signed by six states and entered into force on 20 November 1955. The convention was soon complemented by the Customs Convention Regarding the E.C.S. Carnets for Commercial Samples which entered into force on 3 October 1957 and then virtually superseded by the Customs Convention on the A.T.A. Carnet for the Temporary Admission of Goods in 1961.

As of 2013, the convention had 66 state parties.

See also
ATA Carnet
Product sample
Mailing list

External links
UN Treaty official website
Certified english and french text of the convention, UN Treaty.
Free Samples
Indian treaty page

References

1952 in Switzerland
Advertising
Customs treaties
Sales promotion
Treaties concluded in 1952
Treaties entered into force in 1956
United Nations treaties
Treaties of Australia
Treaties of Austria
Treaties of Belgium
Treaties of Bosnia and Herzegovina
Treaties of Canada
Treaties of Croatia
Treaties of Cuba
Treaties of Cyprus
Treaties of the Czech Republic
Treaties of Czechoslovakia
Treaties of the Republic of the Congo (Léopoldville)
Treaties of Denmark
Treaties of the Republic of Egypt (1953–1958)
Treaties of Fiji
Treaties of Finland
Treaties of France
Treaties of West Germany
Treaties of Ghana
Treaties of the Kingdom of Greece
Treaties of Guinea
Treaties of Haiti
Treaties of the Hungarian People's Republic
Treaties of Iceland
Treaties of India
Treaties of Indonesia
Treaties of Pahlavi Iran
Treaties of Ireland
Treaties of Israel
Treaties of Italy
Treaties of Jamaica
Treaties of Japan
Treaties of Kenya
Treaties of Liberia
Treaties of Luxembourg
Treaties of the Federation of Malaya
Treaties of Malta
Treaties of Mauritius
Treaties of Mexico
Treaties of Montenegro
Treaties of the Netherlands
Treaties of New Zealand
Treaties of Nigeria
Treaties of Norway
Treaties of the Dominion of Pakistan
Treaties of the Polish People's Republic
Treaties of the Estado Novo (Portugal)
Treaties of South Korea
Treaties of the Federation of Rhodesia and Nyasaland
Treaties of the Socialist Republic of Romania
Treaties of Rwanda
Treaties of Serbia and Montenegro
Treaties of Sierra Leone
Treaties of Singapore
Treaties of Slovakia
Treaties of Slovenia
Treaties of Francoist Spain
Treaties of the Dominion of Ceylon
Treaties of Sweden
Treaties of Switzerland
Treaties of Thailand
Treaties of Tonga
Treaties of Trinidad and Tobago
Treaties of Turkey
Treaties of Uganda
Treaties of the United Kingdom
Treaties of Tanganyika
Treaties of the United States
Treaties of Yugoslavia
Treaties extended to the Faroe Islands
Treaties extended to Greenland
Treaties extended to the Territory of Papua and New Guinea
Treaties extended to the Belgian Congo
Treaties extended to Ruanda-Urundi
Treaties extended to the Netherlands Antilles
Treaties extended to Aruba
Treaties extended to Netherlands New Guinea
Treaties extended to Surinam (Dutch colony)
Treaties extended to West Berlin
Treaties extended to Liechtenstein
Treaties extended to the Cook Islands
Treaties extended to Niue
Treaties extended to Tokelau
Treaties extended to the Western Samoa Trust Territory
Treaties extended to the Colony of Aden
Treaties extended to the Aden Protectorate
Treaties extended to the Colony of Barbados
Treaties extended to British Guiana
Treaties extended to British Honduras
Treaties extended to British Cyprus
Treaties extended to the Falkland Islands
Treaties extended to the Colony of Fiji
Treaties extended to the Gambia Colony and Protectorate
Treaties extended to Gibraltar
Treaties extended to the Gold Coast (British colony)
Treaties extended to the Colony of Jamaica
Treaties extended to British Hong Kong
Treaties extended to British Kenya
Treaties extended to the British Leeward Islands
Treaties extended to the British Windward Islands
Treaties extended to British Dominica
Treaties extended to the Federation of Malaya
Treaties extended to the Crown Colony of Malta
Treaties extended to British Mauritius
Treaties extended to the Colony of North Borneo
Treaties extended to the Colony and Protectorate of Nigeria
Treaties extended to Saint Helena, Ascension and Tristan da Cunha
Treaties extended to the Colony of Sarawak
Treaties extended to the Crown Colony of Seychelles
Treaties extended to the Colony of Sierra Leone
Treaties extended to the Crown Colony of Singapore
Treaties extended to British Somaliland
Treaties extended to Tanganyika (territory)
Treaties extended to the Crown Colony of Trinidad and Tobago
Treaties extended to the Uganda Protectorate
Treaties extended to the Sultanate of Zanzibar
Treaties extended to the Kingdom of Tonga (1900–1970)
Treaties extended to the Territory of Alaska
Treaties extended to Baker Island
Treaties extended to the Territory of Hawaii
Treaties extended to Howland Island
Treaties extended to Jarvis Island
Treaties extended to Navassa Island
Treaties extended to Palmyra Atoll
Treaties extended to the Panama Canal Zone
Treaties extended to Puerto Rico
Treaties extended to the Trust Territory of the Pacific Islands